Lamprobityle magnifica is a species of beetle in the family Cerambycidae. It was described by Heller in 1923.

References

Apomecynini
Beetles described in 1923